Phipps is a surname derived from the given name Philip.

Notable families
Phipps family, a family of American entrepreneurs and philanthropists:
 Henry Phipps, Jr. (1839–1930) 
 John Shaffer Phipps (1874–1958)
 Gladys Mills Phipps (1883–1970)
 Lillian Bostwick Phipps (1906–1987)
 Ogden Phipps (1908–2002)
 Ogden Mills Phipps (1940–2016)
 A family of British aristocrats, landowners and diplomats:
 Constantine Phipps, 1st Marquess of Normanby (1797–1863), Lord Lieutenant of Ireland
 George Phipps, 2nd Marquess of Normanby (1819–1890), soldier and politician
 Henry Phipps, 1st Earl of Mulgrave (1755–1831), Foreign Secretary
 Constantine Phipps, 1st Baron Mulgrave (1722–1775), Irish peer
 Constantine Phipps, 2nd Baron Mulgrave (1744–1792), explorer
 Charles Phipps (1753–1786), naval officer
 Ramsay Weston Phipps (1838–1923) Royal Artillery, military historian
 Sir Constantine Phipps (1840–1911), diplomat
 Sir Eric Phipps (1875–1945), diplomat
 A family of British brewers, businessmen and politicians from Towcester and Northampton:
 Pickering Phipps I (1772–1830), founder of Phipps brewery in 1801, mayor of Northampton 1821
 John Phipps (1798–1875), mayor of Northampton 1831
 John Phipps 2 (1823–1883), mayor of Northampton
 Pickering Phipps II (1827–1890), mayor of Northampton, J.P., MP
 Pickering Phipps III (1861–1937), businessman, High Sheriff of Northamptonshire
 An English family with origins as clothiers (and, later, land-owners) from Westbury, Wiltshire:
 Thomas Phipps (–1715), merchant and briefly member of Parliament
 William Phipps (-1748), Governor of Bombay
 James Phipps (–1723), Captain-General of the Royal African Company and Governor of Cape Coast Castle
 John Lewis Phipps (1801–1870), coffee merchant and briefly member of Parliament
 Charles Paul Phipps (1815–1880), coffee merchant and member of Parliament
 Charles Nicholas Paul Phipps (1845–1913), coffee merchant and member of Parliament
 Joyce Grenfell (née Phipps) (1910–1979), writer and actor
 Simon Wilton Phipps (1921–2001), Bishop of Lincoln
 Jack Phipps CBE (1925–2010), arts administrator
 Martin Phipps (born 1968), composer

Notable people
Bill Phipps (born 1942), also known as Reverend William Phipps, Canadian church leader and social justice activist
Cecil Phipps (1896–1968), English footballer

Ernest Phipps (1900–1963), American singer and Pentecostal preacher
Grace Phipps (born 1992), American actress
Jennifer Phipps (1932-2019), Canadian actress
Jill Phipps (1964–1995), English animal rights activist
Lawrence C. Phipps (1862–1958), United States Senator from Colorado
McKinley Phipps, Jr. (born 1977), American rapper better known as Mac
Mike Phipps (born 1947), professional football quarterback
Peter J. Phipps (born 1973), American judge  
Polly Phipps, American statistician
Prikeba Phipps, American Olympic volleyball player
Quentin Phipps, American politician and member of the Connecticut House of Representatives
Steve Phipps (born 1971), American football coach
Spencer Phips (1685–1757), nephew and adoptive son of Sir William, lieutenant governor and acting governor of colonial Massachusetts
Thomas Phipps (?-1823), London silversmith
William Phips (1651–1695), colonial governor of Massachusetts
William Edward Phipps (1922–2018), Hollywood actor and producer

Others 
Phipps W. Lake (1789–1860), American politician
Bess Phipps Dawson (1916–1994), American painter

See also 
 Philips (disambiguation)

References

Dutch-language surnames
English-language surnames
Patronymic surnames
Surnames from given names